Several notable blizzards occurred in 2006.
The North American blizzard of 2006, which delivered record snowfall to New York City
The Early Winter 2006 North American Storm Complex affected parts of southern Canada in December
The December 20-21, 2006 Colorado Blizzard struck Colorado and some surrounding areas on December 20-21
The October Surprise Storm in Western New York